Braian Ezequiel Miranda (born 19 January 1993) is an Argentine professional footballer who plays as a midfielder for Tristán Suárez.

Career
Miranda made the breakthrough into senior football with Argentinos Juniors, after manager Ricardo Caruso Lombardi selected him off the bench in a Copa Argentina defeat to Sportivo Belgrano. He made no further appearances for the club, eventually departing in January 2015 to Primera B de Chile outfit Unión San Felipe. His bow came in a 2–0 victory over Everton on 2 February, with his first goal coming on 21 March against the same side. He also scored versus Coquimbo Unido and Concepción in 2014–15, a campaign which he ended with two red cards in three fixtures. He stayed for 2015–16, twenty-five games and two goals came.

On 31 August 2016, Miranda returned to his homeland with Fénix. Seven goals in twenty-two matches followed, which included a brace over UAI Urquiza in December 2016. In the succeeding July, Miranda departed on loan to fellow third tier team Atlanta. He scored five times in his first season, as they reached the promotion play-offs but were eliminated by Tristán Suárez. Miranda would go on to join the latter club on loan in July 2019.

Career statistics
.

References

External links

1993 births
Living people
Argentine footballers
Argentine expatriate footballers
People from Tigre, Buenos Aires
Association football midfielders
Sportspeople from Buenos Aires Province
Primera B de Chile players
Primera B Metropolitana players
Argentinos Juniors footballers
Unión San Felipe footballers
Club Atlético Fénix players
Club Atlético Atlanta footballers
CSyD Tristán Suárez footballers
Argentine expatriate sportspeople in Chile
Expatriate footballers in Chile